The V-2 rocket was a German early ballistic missile of World War II.

V2 or V-2 may also refer to:

Vehicles, craft, and ships
 Soviet submarine V-2
 USS V-2, a 1924 Barracuda-class submarine of the United States Navy
 ARA Veinticinco de Mayo (V-2), an aircraft carrier in the Argentine Navy from 1969 to 1997
 Culver V-2, a two-seat cabin monoplane
 Fokker V.2, a German fighter aircraft prototype
 MIT EAD Airframe Version 2, the first ion wind airplane
 Voyager 2 spacecraft
 Dragon V2, a commercial spacecraft being developed for astronaut crew transport
 LNER Class V2, a British railway steam locomotive class
 NER Class V2, a class of British steam locomotives (later redesignated class Z)

Engines
 Curtiss V-2, a 12-cylinder Vee liquid-cooled aircraft engine
 Diesel model V-2, a twelve-cylinder Soviet tank engine, used in the T-34
 V-twin engine

Biology
 V2 receptor, a protein that acts as receptor for arginine vasopressin
 Maxillary nerve, (V2), the second division of the trigeminal nerve
 Visual Area 2 of the Visual Cortex

Science and technology
 V2 word order, the verb-second word order of Germanic languages and other languages
 Velocity 2 (V2 speed), aircraft safe-takeoff speed
 V2, one of six precordial leads in electrocardiography
 Parameter describing the azimuthal anisotropy in heavy-ion collisions
 V-2 trailer, a mobile ground-controlled approach radar system element

The arts
 "V-2 Schneider", a mostly instrumental piece on the 1977 David Bowie album Heroes
 V2 (album), second studio album (1978) by punk rock band the Vibrators
 "V2" (song), a single by That Petrol Emotion
 V2: Dead Angel, a 2007 Finnish film

Businesses and products
 V2 Records, a record label founded by Richard Branson
 V2 Radio, a radio station set up as a local successor to the UKRD Group station in Sussex
 V2.fi, a Finnish gaming and entertainment-oriented website
 Byte (service), a short-form video hosting service formerly known as "v2"
 Hanlin eReader V2, an ebook reader
 V2, a brand of electronic cigarettes made by VMR Products

Other
 Vatican II or Second Vatican Council (1962 - 1965)
 V2, Antigua & Barbuda's International Telecommunication Union prefix
 V2 Institute for the Unstable Media, a Rotterdam-based new media research institute
 V.2, a telephone communications standard of the ITU-T